Hunan Science and Technology Museum is a museum located in Tianxin District, Changsha, Hunan, China.
It is adjacent to the Hunan Youth Activity Center, Hunan Mass Art Museum, and Hunan Museum of Geology.

History
Hunan Science and Technology Museum was founded by the Hunan government and Changsha government.

On 9 April 2021, Hunan Science and Technology Museum has been designated as a "Youth Education Base of Hunan" by the Hunan Provincial Committee of the Communist Youth League of China.

Architecture
The main building is in the shape of "Whirlpool Galaxy" and draws lessons from the "cirrus pattern" of Chu culture.

The halls of the museum are as follows:
Sharing Hall
Heaven and Earth Hall
Information Harbor Hall
Mathematical Enlightenment Hall
Space Exploration Hall
Earth Home Hall
Energy World Hall
Life Experience Hall
Children's Fun Hall

Transportation
 Take subway Line 1 to get off at Provincial Government station

References

External links
 

Science museums in China
Museums in Hunan